Christopher M. Still (born 1961) is a painter of Florida's wildlife, people and landscapes. He has worked out of Dunedin, Florida and has a gallery in Tarpon Springs, Florida. His career was honored in 2010 with induction into the Florida Artists Hall of Fame. 

Still received a commission for ten large paintings covering the history of Florida for the Florida House of Representatives. That project is discussed in a section in Jeff Klinkenberg's book Seasons of Florida. 

According to his website, Still is a Florida native, attended the Pennsylvania Academy of Fine Arts on a full scholarship won through a national competition, studied human anatomy at Jefferson Medical School and apprenticed in traditional techniques in Florence, Italy. The website also states he won a European Travel Fellowship and the Pennsylvania Governor's Award for outstanding accomplishment in Fine Art, before returning to Tampa Bay in 1986.

References

External links
Christopher Still website
Christopher M. Still Collection at the University of South Florida

1961 births
Living people